Presidents of the American Psychiatric Association

References 

Psychology lists
presidents of the American Psychiatric Association